Fire Station No. 4 in Columbus, Indiana was designed by architect Robert Venturi.  It is architecturally significant for being an early example of postmodern architecture.

Architecture
In 1967, Venturi was asked by the fire department of the city of Columbus to design a fire station, which was to be an "ordinary building that was easy to maintain". The design features a trapezoidal plan, with a semicircular tower serving as the main entrance to the building. Notable about this tower is the large yellow number 4 which has been placed on top.

References

External links

1968 establishments in Indiana
Fire stations in Indiana
Buildings and structures in Columbus, Indiana
Fire stations completed in the 20th century
Government buildings completed in 1968
Postmodern architecture in the United States